Werner Resel (born 22 June 1935) is a German cellist. From 1987 to 1997 he was chairman of the Vienna Philharmonic.

Life 
Born in Essen, from 1949 Resel studied cello with Richard Krotschak at the Vienna Music Academy. From 1955 to 1959 he was solo cellist of the Tonkünstler Orchestra.

In 1959 Walter Weller, Josef Kondor, Helmut Weis and Resel founded the Weller Quartet. In 1959 Resel became a member of the Vienna State Opera and in 1962 a member of the Vienna Philharmonic Orchestra, of which he was its managing director from 1982 to 1986. In 1987 he succeeded Alfred Altenburger (born 1927) as Chairman of the Vienna Philharmonic, being replaced in this role by Clemens Hellsberg in 1997. In 2006 he retired as cellist of the Vienna Philharmonic.

Resel is vice president of the Johann Strauss-Gesellschaft Wien. In 1995 he was a guest on the ORF show .

Discography 
 Weller Quartet: Kammermusik Für Waldhorn Und Streicher, Amadeo
 Chamber Music Of The Late 18th Century, Mace Records 1970
 Franz Schmidt: Quintette, Preiser Records 1964

Honours 
 1992: Wiener Ehrenmedaille in Gold.
 1993: Golden Medal of Honour of the Johann Strauss Society Vienna.
 1995: Österreichisches Ehrenzeichen für Wissenschaft und Kunst 1st class.
 2001: Doyen and honorary member of the Vienna State Opera.
 Berufstitel Professor

References

External links 
 
 
 Recording on AllMUSIC

German classical cellists
Players of the Vienna Philharmonic
Recipients of the Austrian Cross of Honour for Science and Art, 1st class
1935 births
Living people
Musicians from Essen